The Sotone is a model of French horn made by the British firm Boosey and Hawkes during the late 19th and early 20th century. It is based on the natural horn, and plays a good deal closer to the way a natural horn does than a conventional French horn. This has prompted some people to remove the valves from these instruments and use them as cheap natural horns. This is considered by some to improve the playing qualities of the instrument, because the old piston valves were very inefficient. Some Sotones are based on compensating or other kinds of double systems, but the vast majority of them are single horns with crooks to common pitches like F and E-flat. The Sotone and similar horns (Raoux being the most prominent, played by Dennis Brain) were widely used in Britain until the 1940s. They then began to be replaced by larger, more efficient horns made to the German design.

Brass instruments